Narborough railway station serves the villages of Narborough and Littlethorpe in Leicestershire. The station is owned by Network Rail and managed by East Midlands Railway, who do not serve the station. Only CrossCountry trains serve the station.

A full range of tickets for travel is available from the station ticket office, which is open from 0640 to 1300 Mondays to Saturdays, or at other times from the guard on the train at no extra cost.

History
The station was opened in 1864 by the South Leicestershire Railway, which was taken over by the London and North Western Railway in 1867.

British Railways closed the station on 4 March 1968, but public objections led BR to reopen it on 5 January 1970. Restoration of the station after 21 months of disuse cost £3,250, which was paid for by the then Blaby Rural District Council and Narborough Parish Council.

Next to the station is a level crossing across Station Road.

Services

This station has a waiting room, which is open for the same hours as the booking office.

References

External links

Railway stations in Leicestershire
DfT Category F2 stations
Former London and North Western Railway stations
Railway stations in Great Britain opened in 1864
Railway stations in Great Britain closed in 1968
Railway stations in Great Britain opened in 1970
Reopened railway stations in Great Britain
Railway stations served by CrossCountry
Beeching closures in England
Railway stations in Great Britain not served by their managing company